Leon Toubin, known locally as "The Last Jew of Brenham", a Jewish Texan civic leader, philanthropist, and historian, is the caretaker of B'nai Abraham Synagogue (Brenham, Texas), which he began attending in the late 1930s as part of the daily minyan.

Family
Leon Toubin is the son of Sam H. Toubin and Rosa (Levin) Toubin. The Blinn College website states that, "Sam Toubin, long-time businessman, owned and operated the New York stores in nine towns in Texas. Rosa Toubin, a Brenham native, attended local schools, Blinn College and Rice University. Both were civic leaders and well respected in the Brenham area for their philanthropic endeavors." Leon Toubin was raised in Brenham.

Religious activities
After his mother's death in 1989, Toubin became the caretaker of B'Nai Abraham Synagogue. The synagogue was formally organized in 1885. Toubin and his wife are the last two members of the congregation.

Toubin was interviewed for several books and a documentary which focused on oral histories of Jews in America, and specifically in Texas. In the book Lone Stars of David: The Jews of Texas, Toubin discusses the history of the Brenham, Texas Jewhish community and laments the lack of participation at the synagogue. He expounds on the subject in Growing Up Jewish in America: An Oral History, mentioning that many of the descendants of the Brenham Jewish community "were probably all Jewish once, but we're Lutheran now." In the documentary At Home on the Range: Jewish Life in Texas, Toubin tells a similar story about a Washington County Sheriff. The sheriff once told Toubin that "I was probably Jewish. But the family came here and there weren’t any Jewish girls to marry. Everyone intermarried and I'm Lutheran today. But I was probably Jewish at one time."

Civic leadership
Toubin is involved in a project to restore an historic cistern on Toubin's property on Main Street. He is also on the board of trustees for Blinn College, and on the board of directors of the Economic Development Foundation of Brenham. Toubin is also the caretaker of the B'Nai Abraham Jewish cemetery.

"Main Street Brenham will be able to complete its Toubin Park Project with the help of a $25,000 community development grant. This grant, provided by the Lower Colorado River Authority, will be used to purchase benches, trash receptacles and lampposts for the new park area in downtown Brenham."

Philanthropy
Toubin and his wife have given money to various philanthropic organizations, including the Texas Hillel, the "Julie Rogers 'Gift of Life Program'", the Camp Young Judea program in Texas, and The University of Texas "Longhorn Foundation".

References

See also
History of the Jews in Brenham, Texas

Jews and Judaism in Brenham, Texas
American Orthodox Jews
People from Brenham, Texas
Living people
Rice University alumni
Blinn College alumni
Year of birth missing (living people)